The Six Lakes are a chain of six alpine and glacial Paternoster lakes in Custer County, Idaho, United States, located in the White Cloud Mountains in the Sawtooth National Recreation Area.  The lakes are located on the upper portion of the Fourth of July Creek watershed, a tributary of the Salmon River.  The Six Lakes are above Heart Lake.  The lakes have not been individually named, and the three uppermost lakes are at nearly the same elevation and may form one lake when water levels are high.  While no trails lead to the lakes, they are most easily accessed from Sawtooth National Forest road 205 along Fourth of July Creek.  The lakes do not have official names and are listed from lowest to highest elevation.

References

See also

 List of lakes of the White Cloud Mountains
 Sawtooth National Forest
 Sawtooth National Recreation Area
 White Cloud Mountains

Lakes of Idaho
Lakes of Custer County, Idaho
Glacial lakes of the United States
Glacial lakes of the Sawtooth National Forest